Juan Thornhill (born October 19, 1995) is an American football safety for the Cleveland Browns of the National Football League (NFL). Thornhill previously played for the Kansas City Chiefs, where he won two Super Bowls. He played college football at Virginia.

Early years
Thornhill attended Altavista High School in Altavista, Virginia. He played safety and quarterback in high school. He committed to the University of Virginia to play college football. Thornhill also played basketball in high school.

College career
Thornhill played at Virginia from 2015 to 2018. Thornhill played cornerback and safety at Virginia, where he graduated in December 2018 with a degree in Anthropology. During his career, he had 208 tackles, 13 interceptions and 1.5 sack.

Professional career

Kansas City Chiefs

2019
The Kansas City Chiefs selected Thornhill in the second round with the 63rd overall pick of the 2019 NFL Draft. Thornhill was the sixth safety drafted in 2019. The Chiefs originally acquired the second round pick (63rd overall) during a trade with the Los Angeles Rams in 2018. 

On May 14, 2019, the Kansas City Chiefs signed Thornhill to a four-year, $4.64 million contract that includes $1.79 million guaranteed and a signing bonus of $1.37 million. Throughout training camp, Thornhill competed to be the starting free safety against veteran Daniel Sorensen. The role was vacant after the Chiefs released Eric Berry and following the departure of Eric Murray in free agency. Head coach Andy Reid named Thornhill the backup free safety, behind Daniel Sorensen, to begin the regular season.

He made his professional regular season debut and first career start in the Kansas City Chiefs' season-opener at the Jacksonville Jaguars and recorded eight combined tackles (five solo) during a 40–26 victory. Thornhill was named the starting free safety immediately after kickoff.

In Week 6 against the Houston Texans, Thornhill recorded his first career interception off a pass thrown by Deshaun Watson in the 31–24 loss.
In week 13 against the Oakland Raiders, Thornhill intercepted a pass thrown by Derek Carr and returned it for a 46 yard touchdown in the 40–9 win.
He finished the season with three interceptions and 42 tackles finishing off an impressive rookie campaign.

On December 29, 2019, Thornhill tore his left ACL in a game against the Los Angeles Chargers, forcing him to miss the postseason after starting all 16 games of the regular season. Without Thornhill, the Chiefs won Super Bowl LIV against the San Francisco 49ers 31–20. He was placed on the active/physically unable to perform list at the start of training camp on July 31, 2020. He was activated from the list on August 19, 2020.

2020
In Week 4 against the New England Patriots, Thornhill recorded his first interception of the season during the 26–10 win. Thornhill finished the 2020 season with 41 total tackles, three passes deflected, and one interception. Thornhill helped the Chiefs reach Super Bowl LV, but lost 31-9 to the Tampa Bay Buccaneers.

2022
In 2022, Thornhill won his second Super Bowl in four years when the Chiefs defeated the Philadelphia Eagles in Super Bowl LVII 38-35. Thornhill had 5 tackles and 1 pass defended in the victory.

Cleveland Browns
On March 16, 2023, Thornhill signed a three year deal with the Cleveland Browns.

References

External links
Cleveland Browns bio
Kansas City Chiefs bio
Virginia Cavaliers bio

1995 births
Living people
People from Altavista, Virginia
Players of American football from Virginia
American football safeties
Virginia Cavaliers football players
Kansas City Chiefs players
Cleveland Browns players